A by-election was held for the New South Wales Legislative Assembly electorate of Willoughby on 9 September 1903 because of the bankruptcy of George Howarth.

Dates

Result

George Howarth was made bankrupt.

See also
Electoral results for the district of Willoughby
List of New South Wales state by-elections

Notes

References

1903 elections in Australia
New South Wales state by-elections
1900s in New South Wales